Rochelle may refer to:

Places in the United States
Rochelle, Florida
Rochelle, Georgia
Rochelle, Illinois
Rochelle, Texas
Rochelle, Virginia

People
Rochelle (given name), including a list of people with this name
John of la Rochelle (died 1245), French Franciscan theologian

Surname
Alexandra Rochelle (born 1983), French volleyballer
 Claire Rochelle (1908–1981), American actress 
June Rochelle, American soul singer
Karyn Rochelle, American country music songwriter
Robert Rochelle (born 1945), American politician

Fictional characters
Rochelle (Everybody Hates Chris), a character from the television series Everybody Hates Chris
Rochelle, a playable character in Left 4 Dead 2
Rochelle Goyle, a character in Monster High

Other uses
Rochelle, Rochelle, a fictional film described within the 1990s TV sitcom Seinfeld
Rochelle (LB&SCR no.119), a London, Brighton and South Coast Railway E1 class

See also

Rochelle School, a historic site in Rochelle, Florida
Rochelle School of the Arts, in Lakeland, Florida

Battle of La Rochelle (disambiguation)
La Rochelle (disambiguation)
New Rochelle, New York
Rochelle Park, New Jersey